Eucalyptus nutans, commonly known as red-flowered moort, is a species of mallet that is endemic to a small area near the south coast of Western Australia. It has smooth bark, oblong to almost round adult leaves, flower buds in groups of seven, red or pinkish flowers and cup-shaped to conical fruit.

Description
Eucalyptus nutans is a single-stemmed, small tree that typically grows to a height of  but does not form a lignotuber. It has smooth, light brown to grey bark. Flowering occurs between November and April and the stamens are red, rarely cream-coloured. The seeds are black with a compressed oval shape.

Taxonomy and naming
Eucalyptus nutans was first formally described in 1863 by Ferdinand von Mueller from specimens collected by George Maxwell near Bremer Bay. The description was published in his book Fragmenta phytographiae Australiae. The specific epithet is a Latin word meaning "nodding", referring to the flowers.

In 1852, William Jackson Hooker described Eucalyptus platypus from specimens collected near King George Sound. 
In 2002, around a century and a half after the description of E. platypus, Ian Brooker and Stephen Hopper published the names Eucalyptus platypus subsp. congregata, E.cernua and E. vesiculosa. 

Between 1968 and 1989, seed collected from Bremer Bay for the Kings Park Botanic Garden was labelled "Eucalyptus platypus". Field trips to Bremer Bay in 1999 and 2003, convinced Nathan McQuoid and Stephen Hopper that these plants were in fact E. nutans. 

Collections of specimens of "red-flowered moort" from near Ravensthorpe are now known to be of E. cernua and some specimens of E. cernua are now known as E. proxima.

Distribution
This mallet is only known from a single location near Bremer Bay where is grows in a more or less pure stand with Acacia glaucoptera, A. cyclops, Hakea laurina, Eucalyptus phenax, E. occidentalis, Rhadinothamnus rudis and species of Lepidosperma and Astroloma also present.

Conservation status
This eucalypt classified as "Threatened Flora (Declared Rare Flora — Extant)" by the Department of Environment and Conservation (Western Australia). It is only known from a single location where there are several thousand plants over a few hectares. Many plants were killed in a 1995 fire. It is rare in nature but is known as cultivated specimens in gravel pits near Albany and in Kings Park, grown from the seed collected between 1968 and 1989.

See also
List of Eucalyptus species

References

Eucalypts of Western Australia
Trees of Australia
nutans
Myrtales of Australia
Taxa named by Ferdinand von Mueller
Plants described in 1863